Joe Hand Sr. (born September 10, 1936) is the founder and chairman of Joe Hand Promotions, Inc. Hand is a promoter of Pay-Per-View and Closed Circuit broadcasts of sporting events since 1971.

Early life and career 
Hand was born in 1936 and raised in the Lawncrest section of Philadelphia. Early choices he made were the start of a lifetime of service to others. Hand's service to the community began with his acceptance into the Philadelphia Police Department in 1959. During his time in the police department, Hand received many commendations for his heroic efforts, and was promoted to Detective in the department's prestigious Intelligence Unit. Despite a successful career with the Philadelphia Police Department, a serious heart attack in 1975 cut short any thoughts of continuing in this field. Fortunately for Hand, he had begun paving another path in 1967 when he became a charter shareholder of Cloverlay Corporation, the organization that helped guide Joe Frazier to the heavyweight champion of the world. With the advent of closed-circuit TV, Hand became intrigued by the prospect of forming his own company specializing in sports promotions.

Joe Hand Promotions 
Hand's association with Cloverlay gave insight, guidance, and opportunity as he formed his own business, Joe Hand Promotions, Inc., in 1971. Today, the company has grown into a top TV distributor of pay-per-view boxing, UFC and special events in the country. Its customer base includes over 5,000 sports-oriented commercial establishments, such as sports bars, restaurants, military bases, universities, cruise ships and oil rigs. The company has been involved in many major championship fights nationwide including Joe Frazier vs. Muhammad Ali, Sugar Ray Leonard vs. Thomas Hearns, Mike Tyson vs. Lennox Lewis, Bernard Hopkins vs. Felix Trinidad,  Oscar DeLaHoya vs. Floyd Mayweather and Miguel Cotto vs. Canelo Alvarez. Joe Hand Promotions has also been able to exhibit the monthly pay-per-view UFC events to its huge network of bars and restaurants nationwide including large chains such as Buffalo Wild Wings, Hooters, and Tilted Kilt. The company has also promoted the World Cup, Woodstock '94, David Bowie, the Mr. Olympia Bodybuilding Championship, Kenny Rogers, The Beach Boys, Frankie Valli, WWE, The Grateful Dead, and The Harlem Globetrotters. They also work with DirecTV in bringing the NFL Sunday Ticket to hundreds of commercial establishments throughout the country..

In January 2021, the company began offering a commercial subscription of ESPN Plus for Business which delivers limited live sports content via DirecTV to commercial establishments. As of October, 2021, close to 4500 bars, restaurants and other commercial establishments nationwide have subscribed to ESPN Plus through Joe Hand Promotions.

Joe Hand Boxing Gym and Computer Lab 
As his company evolved into one of the top sports promotion companies in the United States, Hand continued to give back to the community. Opened in 1995, the Joe Hand Boxing Gym and Computer Lab helped turn a desolate area of the city into a vibrant hub of activity. The first of its kind in the U.S., it not only trains children's bodies, but their minds as well. The Joe Hand Boxing Gym offers regulation boxing rings, brand new equipment and a modern computer center where children can participate in the education process, whether or not they're interested in learning how to box. To date, this gym had reached over 1,000 children. When speaking about his facility, Joe Hand Sr. sums it up best:  "When a child or teen arrives at the gym with a gym bag on one shoulder and a school bag on the other, we know we are doing something right!"

Personal life 
Hand married Margaret Joyce on June 29, 1957. Together, they have two children: Joe Hand Jr. and Margaret Hand-Cicalese.

Awards and recognition 
 Pennsylvania Sports Hall Of Fame (1992)
 World Boxing Association "Closed Circuit Promoter of the Year" (1996)
 "Man of the Year" in the King One Veterans Boxers Association(1999)
 Golden Gloves Hall of Fame (2000)
 Advisory Board, National Penn Bank (2000)
 Middle Atlantic Amateur Boxing Association's Hall of Fame (2001)
 Philadelphia Sports Congress "Wanamaker Award" (2002)
 Northeast Catholic High School's Alumni Hall of Fame (2005)
 Pennsylvania Boxing Hall of Fame (2012)
 Pennsylvania Sports Experience, Board of Trustees (2012)
 Philadelphia Sports Hall of Fame (2013)

References

http://joehandgym.com/
http://www.joehandpromotions.com/
http://boxrec.com/person/718775?role=manager
http://www.phillyboxinghistory.com/more/pahof/inductees/inductee_hand_joe_sr.htm
https://www.openminds.com/market-intelligence/bulletins/112312-northeast-community-center-behavioral.htm/
http://whyy.org/cms/radiotimes/2012/09/13/joe-frazier-his-life-career-and-the-city-of-brotherly-love/

1936 births
Living people
Businesspeople from Philadelphia
Philadelphia Police Department officers